Clark T. "Sandy" Randt Jr. (Pinyin: Léi Dé; born November 24, 1945) is an American lawyer and diplomat who served as the United States Ambassador to the People's Republic of China from July 23, 2001 to January 20, 2009, making him the longest-serving U.S. Ambassador to China.  Randt was formerly a partner with the law firm of Shearman & Sterling in Hong Kong, where he headed the firm's China practice.

Education
After preparing at The Hotchkiss School, Randt graduated from Yale University with a Bachelor of Arts in 1968 and received his Juris Doctor from the University of Michigan Law School in 1975. He also attended Harvard Law School where he was awarded the East Asia Legal Studies Traveling Fellowship to China. While at Yale, he was a member of Delta Kappa Epsilon fraternity with George W. Bush.

Career
From 1968 to 1972, Randt served in the United States Air Force Security Service, and in 1974 he was the China representative of the National Council for United States-China Trade.

Randt was a resident of Beijing from 1982 through 1984 where he served as First Secretary and Commercial Attache at the U.S. Embassy. He then lived in Hong Kong for 18 years, most recently as a partner with the international law firm of Shearman & Sterling where he headed the firm's China practice. Randt was Governor and First Vice President of the American Chamber of Commerce in Hong Kong. He is a member of the New York and Hong Kong bars and is a recognized expert on Chinese law. He is fluent in Mandarin Chinese.

Randt was nominated U.S. Ambassador to China by President George W. Bush on April 30, 2001 and confirmed by the U.S. Senate on July 11, 2001. He was sworn in as U.S. Ambassador to China on July 17, 2001 and arrived in Beijing on July 23.

Randt has been an opponent to the sale of defensive weapons to the Republic of China (Taiwan) in the face of opposition from the Communist government in Beijing.

As a political appointee, Randt was required by convention to resign at the end of Bush's term. The Deputy Chief of Mission took over as chargé d'affaires at the U.S. embassy for several months before Barack Obama's appointment of Jon Huntsman. Randt is currently a special advisor to Hopu Investment Management, a Chinese private equity fund.

Personal life
Randt is married and has three children.

References

External links
"The State of U.S.-China Relations -- A video presentation by Amb. Randt at the USC U.S.-China Institute on April 21, 2008
 United States Embassy in Beijing
United States Department of State: Biography of Clark T. Randt Jr.
Profile of Clark T. Randt Jr.
Presidential Nomination: Clark "Sandy" T. Randt

1945 births
Living people
Hotchkiss School alumni
Yale University alumni
Harvard Law School alumni
Ambassadors of the United States to China
University of Michigan Law School alumni
People associated with Shearman & Sterling